Bokros or Bokroš (Hungaro-Slovak rendition) is a Hungarian surname meaning "bushy". Notable people with the surname include:
Ernest Bokroš (born 1959), Slovak ice hockey coach
Lajos Bokros (born 1954),  Hungarian economist
Lukáš Bokroš (born 1982), Slovak former professional ice hockey left winger
Szilárd Bokros (born 2000), Hungarian footballer
Tibor Bokros (born 1989), Hungarian football player
Tomáš Bokroš (born 1989), Slovak professional ice hockey defenceman
Verona Ádám Bokros (born 1948), Serbian politician of Hungarian descent
Zsuzsa Bokros-Török (born 1947), Hungarian volleyball player

See also
Bokros package
Bokor (surname) 

Hungarian-language surnames
Surnames of Slovak origin
Surnames of Hungarian origin